Belimbla Park is a semi-rural estate in the Macarthur Region of New South Wales, Australia, in the Wollondilly Shire. It is located west of The Oaks and east of Oakdale.

The residents of the estate often have vegetable gardens or small orchards, horses and ponies or other hobby farms.

The estate is the result of a subdivision of an apple orchard, with blocks often between 2-10 acres in size.

References

Localities in New South Wales
Wollondilly Shire